Vicente Ortega Vila (born September 11, 1950) is a former Spanish handball player who competed in the 1972 Summer Olympics.

In 1972 he was part of the Spanish team which finished fifteenth in the Olympic tournament. He played three matches and scored one goal.

References

1950 births
Living people
Spanish male handball players
Olympic handball players of Spain
Handball players at the 1972 Summer Olympics